Burma competed in the Summer Olympic Games for the first time at the 1948 Summer Olympics in London, England.

Athletics

Men
Track & road events

Boxing

Men

Weightlifting

Men

References
Official Olympic Reports

Nations at the 1948 Summer Olympics
1948
Olympics